Dürriaden Kadın ("shining heaven"; born Hatice Hanım Voçibe; 16 May 1860 – 17 October 1909) was the second consort of  Sultan Mehmed V of the Ottoman Empire.

Life
Dürrüaden Kadın was born on 16 May 1860 in the Voçibe princely family, in the North Caucasus, in Kars or Sochi. Her father was Voçibe Mustafa Bey and her real name was Hatice Hanim. She was aunt of Inşirah Hanim, her brother Aziz Bey's daughter and consort of Mehmed VI. 

She was sent to the Ottoman Palace at three years old and was raised there. She married the then Şehzade Mehmed Reşad on 10 October 1876 in the crown princes apartments (Valihad Mansion) located in the Ortaköy Palace. Mehmed was thirty two years old, while Dürrüaden was sixteen years old. She was his second consort. Two years after the marriage, on 23 June 1878, she gave birth to her only son Şehzade Mahmud Necmeddin. The child had kyphosis and was in poor health. 

On 27 April 1909, after Mehmed's accession to the throne, she was given the title of "Second Kadın".

Death
Stressed and weakened by concern for her son's health, Dürriaden contracted tuberculosis and was sent to solitary confinement. Dürrüaden died on 17 October 1909 in the Vadildebağı Palace at the age of forty-nine, and was buried in the mausoleum of Gülistü Kadın, Fatih Mosque, Fatih, Istanbul. After her death, her son sponsored a fountain in her name at Kuruçeşme. He outlived her by four years dying in 1913.

Issue

See also
Kadın (title)
Ottoman Imperial Harem
List of consorts of the Ottoman sultans

References

Sources

 
 

1860 births
1909 deaths
19th-century consorts of Ottoman sultans
20th-century consorts of Ottoman sultans